The Ministry of Digital Development and Transportation is a central executive body implementing state policy and regulation in the areas of transport (except for the cases determined by the President of the Republic of Azerbaijan), including maritime transport and civil aviation, communications (telecommunication, post), high technologies (information technologies, microelectronics, nano, bio and other innovative science-intensive technologies).

History
The first Ministry of Postal Service and Telegraph of the country was established on May 28, 1918 with declaration of independence of Azerbaijan Democratic Republic (ADR). The first minister was Khudadat bey Malik-Aslanov. When the second cabinet of ADR convened, the government conducted administrative reforms and split the ministry into Ministry of Transportation and the new Ministry of Postal Service and Telegraph. While Malik-Aslanov remained Minister of Transportation, Agha Ashurov was put in charge to lead the Ministry of Postal Service and Telegraph on October 6, 1918. In three successive governments, Aslan bey Safikurdski, Jamo bey Hajinski and J. Ildyrym served as ministers of Postal Service and Telegraph. After establishment of Soviet rule in Azerbaijan on April 28, 1920 the ministry was transformed into Mail and Telegraph Commissariat. From the time of its inception by Soviet authorities, the communications sector was directly managed by permanent representatives of Ministry of Communications of USSR in Azerbaijan up until 1953. After restoration of independence of Azerbaijan in 1991, the Ministry of Communications was re-established.

On February 24, 2004 as per the Presidential Decree of Ilham Aliyev the Ministry of Communications was transformed into a bigger Ministry of Communication and Information Technologies.

The Ministry of Communications and High Technologies of the Republic of Azerbaijan (MCHT) was established on the basis of the Ministry of Communications and Information Technologies of the Republic of Azerbaijan by the Order of President of the Republic of Azerbaijan dated March 7, 2014.

On February 13, 2017 as per the Presidential Decree of Ilham Aliyev the Ministry of Communication and Information Technologies was merged with Ministry of Transportation and transformed into a bigger Ministry of Transport, Communications and High Technologies.

On October 11, 2021 based on the basis of the relevant Presidential Decree, the Ministry of Transport, Communications and High Technologies of the Republic of Azerbaijan was renamed the Ministry of Digital Development and Transport of the Republic of Azerbaijan.

Activity areas of the Ministry
The Ministry carries out activities in the following areas:
participates in the formation of a unified state policy in the relevant area and ensures the implementation of this policy;
carries out state regulation, state control and coordination in the relevant area;
carries out international cooperation in the relevant area;
takes measures to attract investments in the relevant area;
together with relevant government agencies provides the development, implementation and management of international and local investment projects in the relevant area;
grants licenses and permits for the implementation of entrepreneurial activity in the relevant area in the cases and manner provided for by law, exercises control over compliance with license and permit conditions;
makes proposals for the development and increase the competitiveness of all transport corridors passing through the territory of the Republic of Azerbaijan;
monitors the flight safety of civil aircraft, aviation security, as well as the compliance of civil aircraft with environmental protection requirements and ensuring the protection of the environment by aircraft;
organizes marine safety system;
ensures efficient use of telecommunications, including wireless technologies, broadband Internet, post, radio and TV broadcasting and radio frequencies;
participates in the creation and expansion of transit information highways and nodes and regional information services;
together with relevant government bodies, develops and implements scientific-technical and innovation policies for high technologies;
with relevant government bodies implements measures to strengthen the potential of high technologies sector, toencourage the development of competitive high technologies, knowledge-intensive, low-cost products and services and innovative businesses;
with relevant government agencies carries out work todevelop and use of nuclear technologies for peaceful purposes;
participates in policy-making and implementation in the areas of information security, prevention ofglobal cyber attacks, protection ofnational electronic information resources;
in cooperation with relevant state bodies, takes joint measures for the construction, operation and security of telecommunications networks for special purposes of public authorities;
with relevant government agencies participates in the e-government development issues;
organizes the activities and use of the Government Cloud;
provides the development of e-signature infrastructure and its wide use;
develops and implements measures for the development of the information society;
exercises control over the efficient use of state property in the relevant area and ensures the protection of the state interests;
implements policy-making activities in the relevant area;
implements measures for the development of the relevant area.

Projects

Dilmanc project 
This project is designed to create and implement formal linguistic technologies for the Azerbaijani language. Translation and dictionary systems between English, Russian and Azerbaijani languages have been created in the project and is available as an online service. European Association of Machine Translation (EAMT) included Dilmanc Project to the list of European research groups. Within this project voice-responded mobile computer was developed and distributed for blind users. This is a joint project of the Ministry of Transport, Communications and High Technologies and the Heydar Aliyev Foundation.

In 2010 the project leader A.Fatullayev was awarded honorary title “ Honored Engineer” by the president of Azerbaijan.

TASIM Project 
Trans-Eurasian Information Super Highway (TASIM) is a transnational fiber-optic line covering Eurasian countries from the western Europe to the eastern Asia. The declaration on implementation of project was adopted in Baku on November 11, 2008. The project provides main transit link from Frankfurt to Hong Kong and the network will bring together the largest information exchange centers in Europe and Asia. The transit line will stretch across China, Kazakhstan, Georgia, Turkey and Germany. The northern transit link will pass through the territory of Russia, Ukraine and Poland.

AzDataCom Project 
The project was established by the Ministry of Transport, Communications and High Technologies in a partnership with United Nations Development Program (UNDP) and provides a network infrastructure for data transmission covering all regions of the country. The main objectives of the project are elimination of the digital difference in the country, provision opportunities to use e-government services, development of e-government, meeting the demand of the government agencies, the public and the business sector for ICT services.

In the framework of the project AzDataCom network was carried out in 4 stages. At the first and second stages the network segment covering Baku, Sumgait cities and Absheron peninsula was commissioned. At the stages of 3rd and 4th areas located along the Baku-Ganja, Yevlakh- Shirvan and Baku-Astara were added to the network.

Data Center 
Data Center is considered as the first TIER III, ISO 20000 and ISO 27001 certified data center both in Azerbaijan and South Caucasus. The center was established by AzInTelecom LLC on the base of the Ministry of Transport, Communications and High Technologies in 2016.  

The work level of the data center is 99.982%. Servers in the center are under sustainable control for 24 hours and seven days a week.  

Total area of the Data Center is over 700 square meters where data transfer is carried out at high speed.

The first national telecommunications satellite “Azerspace-1” 

The first satellite of Azerbaijan, Azerspace-1 was launched into orbit on February 7, 2013 at 18:36 (on February 8, 2013 at 01:36 Baku time) from the Kourou cosmodrome situated in South America. The satellite was developed by the American company Orbital Sciences.

In 2014, approximately 100 television and 20 radio channels were broadcast via the satellite.

See also
Cabinet of Azerbaijan
Telecommunications in Azerbaijan
State Fund for Development of IT

References

Economy of Azerbaijan
Communications in Azerbaijan
Telecommunications in Azerbaijan
Communications and Information Technologies
Azerbaijan
Cabinets of Azerbaijan
Azerbaijan